NWHS may refer to:
 North Wilkes High School, Hays, North Carolina, United States
 Northwest High School (disambiguation)
 Northwestern High School (disambiguation)
 NorthWood High School, Napanee, Indiana, United States
 New Waverly High School, New Waverly, Texas, United States
 Niles West High School, Skokie, Illinois, United States
 "Not What He Seems", an episode of the second season of Gravity Falls